Ridgefield is a census-designated place (CDP) in Fairfield County, Connecticut, United States. It consists of the primary central village in the town of Ridgefield and surrounding residential areas. As of the 2010 census, the population of the CDP was 7,645, out of 24,638 in the entire town.

Geography
The CDP is in the southern part of the town of Ridgefield and extends south to the border with the town of Wilton. To the east the CDP border follows Nod Road, Branchville Road, Cooper Hill Road, Harvey Road, Ridgewood Road, Florida Hill Road, and Ridgefield Brook. The northern boundary of the CDP follows Copps Hill Road, Maple Shade Road, Saw Mill Hill Road, Mulberry Street, Ramapoo Road, and a short section of Barry Avenue. To the west the CDP boundary follows Peaceable Ridge Road, Peaceable Hill Road, Peaceable Street, Golf Lane, and Silver Spring Road.

Connecticut Route 35 leads west from the southern part of the town center  to the New York state border and continues west another  as New York State Route 35 to Katonah, New York. CT 35 also leads north  to U.S. Route 7 near the southern border of Danbury. Connecticut Route 102 (Branchville Road) leads east from Main Street  to US 7 at Branchville. Connecticut Route 116 (North Salem Road) leads northwest from the north end of Main Street in Ridgefield  to the New York border and continues  further as NY 116 to the center of North Salem, New York.

Demographics
As of the census of 2010, there were 7,645 people, 3,046 households, and 2,018 families residing in the CDP. There were 3,321 housing units, of which 275, or 8.3%, were vacant. The racial makeup of the CDP was 93.6% White, 1.0% African American, 0.1% Native American or Alaska Native, 3.0% Asian, 0.03% Native Hawaiian or Pacific Islander, 0.8% some other race, and 1.5% from two or more races. Hispanic or Latino of any race were 4.2% of the population.

Of the 3,046 households in the community, 36.0% had children under the age of 18 living with them, 56.8% were headed by married couples living together, 7.4% had a female householder with no husband present, and 33.7% were non-families. 30.0% of all households were made up of individuals, and 14.0% were someone living alone who was 65 years of age or older. The average household size was 2.51, and the average family size was 3.17.

27.8% of the CDP population were under the age of 18, 4.3% were from 18 to 24, 20.5% were from 25 to 44, 31.7% were from 45 to 64, and 15.4% were 65 years of age or older. The median age was 43.5 years. For every 100 females, there were 90.1 males. For every 100 females age 18 and over, there were 85.0 males.

For the period 2013-17, the estimated median annual income for a household in the CDP was $125,595, and the median income for a family was $165,333. The per capita income was $74,017. Male full-time workers had a median income of $112,273 versus $40,132 for females. About 0.9% of families and 2.5% of the population were living below the poverty line, including 2.9% of those under age 18 and 4.0% of those age 65 and over.

References

Ridgefield, Connecticut
Villages in Fairfield County, Connecticut
Census-designated places in Fairfield County, Connecticut